Birdie Reeve Kay, born Birdie Reeve (January 16, 1907 - May 31, 1996), was an American champion typist who performed in the 1920s in vaudeville.

She reached speeds of over 200 words, or 800 letters, per minute, and was billed as the "World's Fastest Typist". She used only two fingers of each hand, spread out in a V formation, in a typing system reportedly invented by her father Thomas Reeve. She explained that she achieved her speed by "studying words and not the typewriter", classifying words by their endings, and was reported to have a vocabulary of 64,000 words. She wrote several books on words. In 1924, she appeared at a gathering of the Associated Press to analyze a speech by then President Calvin Coolidge; she sorted the words used in the speech by length.

Her vaudeville act was mentioned in George Burns' 1989 book All My Best Friends. He wrote: "If you could do anything better, faster, longer, more often, higher, worse or differently than anyone else, you could work in vaudeville. For example, 'The World's Fastest Typist' had a great act. She'd type 200 words a minute, then pass the perfectly typed pages out to the audience to be inspected. For her finish she'd put a piece of tin in her typewriter and imitate a drum roll or the clackety-clack of a train picking up speed."

She also was a good chess player as a teenager, gave simultaneous exhibitions, and was sometimes reported to be one of the best female players of her time in America.

She had a daughter, Hope Hirschman, in 1931. She assumed the name Birdie Reeve Kay when she married Harry H. Kay. She later owned and operated a stenography business in Hyde Park, Chicago, and typed many theses for students at the University of Chicago.

References

External links

 Who Was Birdie Reeve?
 Collection of newspaper clippings about Reeve, by Chess Notes
 Photos of Reeve, Chess Notes 4509

1907 births
1996 deaths
Vaudeville performers
People from Chicago
American chess players
20th-century chess players